The Dead River (originally in Albanian "Lumi i Vdekur") is the title of the first novel written by the 20th century Albanian writer Jakov Xoxa. One of the best-known of Jakov Xoxa's, the literary work was written in 1964 only to be published 7 years later.

Plot
The story revolves around the romantic love between the two main characters, Vita and Adil, and the ill fates of three Albanian families which all meet in a little town called Trokth in Albania. The seemingly independent stories that revolve around the three families are well interwoven with the fates of the two lovers.

Setting
Like the other novels of Jakov Xoxa (notably "White Juga" ||), it encompasses a vast number of characters and is also imbued with the realism of pre-World War II Albania, in which the main story is set. It is one of the few works of early socialist realism in Albania which contains literary merits. As many works of that period, it used the Soviet literary model of Sholokhov's And Quiet Flows the Don.Robert Elsie, A start and an end (observations on Albanian contemporary literature and culture) - translated in Albanian by Abdyrrahim Myftiu, Globus, 1995

See also
Jakov Xoxa
Albanian literature

References

1971 novels
20th-century Albanian novels
Novels set in Albania